Comamonas nitrativorans is a Gram-negative, oxidase- and catalase-positive bacterium from the genus  Comamonas, which was isolated from a denitrifying reactor treating landfill leachate. C. nitrativorans has the ability to perform anoxic-reduction of nitrate, nitrite, and nitrous oxide to nitrogen.

References

External links
Type strain of Comamonas nitrativorans at BacDive -  the Bacterial Diversity Metadatabase

Comamonadaceae
Bacteria described in 2011